UQP or Uqp may refer to:

 University of Queensland Press
 Unquadpentium, an unsynthesized chemical element with atomic number 145 and symbol Uqp